The 1923 Oorang Indians season was their second and final season in the league. The team failed to improve on their previous league record of 3–6, winning only one NFL game. They finished eighteenth in the league.

Schedule

Standings

References

Oorang Indians seasons
Oorang Indians
1923 in American sports
Oorang Indians